Robert Scanlon (born 2 June 1954) is a Scottish former professional footballer who played as a defender.

Career
Born in Glasgow, Scanlon played in the United States for the Boston Astros, the Boston Minutemen, the Rhode Island/New England Oceaneers, and the Indianapolis Daredevils. He had first moved to the United States in 1972 as part of an exchange programme, organised by the Church of Scotland. He attended a boarding school in Massachusetts and decided to stay in the country to play soccer, returning to Scotland in 1979.

References

1954 births
Living people
Scottish footballers
Boston Astros players
Boston Minutemen players
Rhode Island Oceaneers players
Indianapolis Daredevils players
American Soccer League (1933–1983) players
North American Soccer League (1968–1984) players
Association football defenders
Scottish expatriate footballers
Scottish expatriates in the United States
Expatriate soccer players in the United States